Shin Eun-Chul (Hangul: 신은철) (born December 26, 1973) is a retired South Korean amateur boxer.

Career
Lee won a bronze medal in the men's lightweight (60 kg) division at the 1997 World Amateur Boxing Championships in Budapest.

Results

External links
 sports-reference profile

1973 births
Living people
Lightweight boxers
Boxers at the 1996 Summer Olympics
Olympic boxers of South Korea
Asian Games medalists in boxing
Boxers at the 1998 Asian Games
South Korean male boxers
AIBA World Boxing Championships medalists
Asian Games bronze medalists for South Korea
Medalists at the 1998 Asian Games